was the Shiori Takei's 2nd studio album, released on September 28, 2005 under Giza Studio label.

Background
The album consists of three previous released singles, such as Kimi wo Shiranai Machi he, Tsunagari and Sekai Tomete. Limited releases included Studio Live version of Kimi wo Shiranai Machi he.

Commercial performance
The album charted at #49  on the Oricon charts in its first week. The album charted for 4 weeks and sold 9,287 copies.

Track listing
All songs has been written by Shiori Takei

Usage in media
Sekai Tomete was used as ending theme for TV anime Detective Conan
Kimi wo Shiranai Machi he: theme song for Nihon TV program "Shiodome Style!"

References 

2005 albums
Shiori Takei albums
Being Inc. albums
Japanese-language albums
Giza Studio albums
Albums produced by Daiko Nagato